"Angel" is the debut solo single by American R&B singer Angela Winbush. The track was released in 1987 as the first single from her debut album, Sharp on Polygram Records. As half of the duo of René & Angela, Winbush had two number-one R&B hits with "Save Your Love (For #1)" and "Your Smile." After a decade, René Moore and Winbush went their separate ways. "Angel", her solo-debut, spent two weeks at the top of the US Billboard R&B chart. It was also named by Billboard the number nine most successful R&B single of 1987.  Despite the success, "Angel" did not make the Billboard Hot 100.

The single was nominated for a 1988 Soul Train Music Award for Best R&B/Soul Single, Female. The song also helped Winbush get nominated for Female Album of the Year. A video for "Angel" was released as a download on iTunes in May 2007.

In 2009, Essence magazine included the song in their list of the "25 Best Slow Jams of All Time".

Track listing
US, Vinyl 12" Single

Charts

Compilations
The song also appears on several compilation albums including:

Billboard Hot R&B Hits 1987
Soul Classics: Quiet Storm—The 80's
Love Jones: Best of Funk Essentials, Vol. 2
Blues & Soul, Vol. 10: 1986-1987
80's Urban Beats and Grooves

References

1987 songs
1987 debut singles
Angela Winbush songs
Songs written by Angela Winbush
PolyGram singles
Contemporary R&B ballads
Soul ballads
1980s ballads